Police Court is a 1932 American pre-Code drama film starring Henry B. Walthall, Leon Janney,  Lionel Belmore, and King Baggot. Directed by Louis King and released by Monogram Pictures, the screenplay was adapted by Stuart Anthony from his story. Police Court features an all-star cast from the silent film era.

Plot
A once popular actor, Nat Barry (played by Henry B. Walthall), is a has-been because of his alcoholism. The legendary film star is forced by necessity to take a job selling patent medicine at a traveling sideshow dressed in a costume as Abraham Lincoln. Having trouble staying sober, he is arrested and taken before a "police court" for drunken disorder. His teenage son, Junior Barry (played by Leon Janney), pleads on Barry's behalf and Judge Robert Webster (played by Edmund Breese) grants him a reprieve.

Junior is determined to see his father make good again, vowing to keep him off the bottle and on the screen. He attempts to get bit parts for Barry, but he has trouble delivering his lines on the movie set for the compassionate director, Henry Field (played by King Baggot).

Cast
Henry B. Walthall as Nat Barry
Leon Janney as Junior Barry
Lionel Belmore as Uncle Al Furman
King Baggot as Henry Field, movie director
Al St. John as Skid
Edmund Breese as Judge Robert Webster
Aileen Pringle as Diana McCormick
Walter James as Cappy Hearn
Al Bridge (credited as Alan Bridge)
Bud Osborne 
Paul Panzer as movie actor
Natalie Joyce as actress
Jack Richardson
Fred Toones as Snowflake (credited as Fred Toones)

External links

1932 films
1932 drama films
American black-and-white films
American drama films
Monogram Pictures films
1930s English-language films
Films directed by Louis King
1930s American films